Swing Away Golf, known in Japan as , is a sports game developed by T&E Soft for the PlayStation 2. Borrowing its concept from Sony's Everybody's Golf), a sports game franchise, Swing Away Golf was shown as a launch title for the system at the PlayStation Festival in 2000 and released by Electronic Arts that same year.

Gameplay
The game borrows its elements from Everybody's Golf, another sports game. In comparison, There are numerous gameplay modes available to the player including a story mode and other single player and multiplayer settings that are pretty much on par with what players would expect from a golf game on a console. The game lets players pick from one of seven different character models to begin the career with. And instead of giving players a preset skill level for each of these characters, it allows players to determine their skill by distributing Skill Points for Distance, Accuracy, Control and Recovery.

Development
In 1999, many third-party developers, including T&E Soft, joined Sony. Not only that but Sony showed how another winning characteristic that helped to launch it to the top of the console heap. On February 8, 2000, T&E Soft announced a release postponement for the game. The game was announced as a PlayStation 2 launch title in Japan, and was scheduled for release on March 23, 2000, priced at 5,800 yen (around $54 US). The game was later shown at the PlayStation Festival in 2000. Before the game was released in Japan, Sony released the demo of the game via a shady source.

On May 26, 2000, Electronic Arts picked up the publishing rights to the title.

On October 12, 2000, Electronic Arts promoted to advertise the game in the United States. The ad covered the span of two pages ad the left three/fourths of the spread pictures two golfers doing their business at a set of urinals with their golf bags on their backs. The smaller guy on the left has a large golf bag with a variety of clubs in it, while the bigger gentleman on the right has a very tiny bag with just a couple of clubs in it. The text on the upper left hand corner of the layout simply says, "Whoever has the most toys wins." The game was released in the United States on October 26, 2000, the same date as the launch of the PlayStation 2.

Reception

The game received "generally favorable reviews" according to the review aggregation website Metacritic.

IGN member David Zdyrko praised the graphics as "beautiful" for a PS2 game. He stated it was "a lot like Hot Shots Golf with some cool improvements, as well as some minor downfalls." He also stated that it "might not be as great as Hot Shots Golf, but it's a phenomenal golf game nonetheless." GameSpots Frank Provo said that the Japanese import is "a game whose features and execution could barely be explained by a book, let alone by a review." GameRevolutions G-Wok called the game "a fun little golfer whose attitude and extras keep the game from getting too dull." He did criticize the loading screens and stated that "some problems with minor slowdown and the lack of creative courses are a disappointment, but the game doesn't suffer too greatly." NextGens Blake Fischer said, "If you want a middle-of-the-road game for your PS2 and you dig golf this might be worth a try, but you're probably better off waiting for Tiger Woods [PGA Tour] 2001." In Japan, Famitsu gave it a score of 27 out of 40.

Notes

References

External links
 

2000 video games
Electronic Arts games
Golf video games
PlayStation 2 games
PlayStation 2-only games
T&E Soft games
Video games developed in Japan